Dobri is a village in Zala County, Hungary, close to the border with Slovenia.

External links 
 Street map 

Populated places in Zala County